Wat'aqucha (Quechua wat'a island, qucha lake, "island lake", hispanicized spelling Huatacocha) is a lake in Peru located in the Pasco Region, Pasco Province, Huayllay District. It is situated west of the larger lake named Aququcha.

References

Lakes of Peru
Lakes of Pasco Region